Jake Curtis Dixon (born 15 January 1996) is a British Grand Prix motorcycle racer competing for GasGas Aspar Team in the 2023 Moto2 World Championship. Dixon is best known for finishing runner-up in the 2018 British Superbike Championship, and being the youngest to qualify for the championship showdown in 2017.

He is the son of Darren Dixon, TT F1 Superbike Champion in 1988 and double World Sidecar Champion in 1995 and 1996.

Career

Early career
At 12 years of age Dixon was competing in the Southern Supermoto Championship before advancing to the Aprilia Superteens Championship in 2010.

In his first year competing on tarmac Dixon came 3rd in the Aprilia 125cc Superteens Championship. The winner that year was Chrissy Rouse, later competing against Dixon in the 2018 British Superbike Championship.

Dixon advanced up to the Aprilia RRV450 Challenge Championship racing Aprilia's twin cylinder four-stroke machine. Once again he was 3rd in the Championship that year.

Supersport 600 Championship
In 2012, at 16 years of age, Dixon advanced to the British National Superstock 600 cc Championship, one of the support classes in the British Superbike Championship. He acquitted himself well on the Shaun Rose prepared, Moto Breakers Yamaha R6, finishing 4th in the Championship. If he had not crashed going over the mountain at Cadwell Park injuring his wrist, he could have finished higher than 4th.

In 2013, Dixon contested the year with a new team and a new championship. He moved up to the Supersport 600 Championship, riding for Craig Fitzpatrick's CF Motorsport team, on a Yamaha R6. After six rounds he crashed heavily at Oulton Park and broke his scaphoid bone. This ended his season, he finished 16th in the championship.

Staying in the Supersport 600 Championship for 2014, Dixon rode for the Appleyard/Macadam/Doodson team again on a Yamaha R6. He finished the season in 8th position.

For 2015, Dixon joined the Smith's team riding a three-cylinder Triumph 675, and achieved 3rd place in the Supersport 600 Championship.

British Superbike Championship
Dixon moved up to the 2016 British Superbike Championship, and while it was originally planned that he would teaming up with Dave Tyson's Tsingtao Kawasaki team for the season, financial concerns led to the team not fielding a pair of riders that season, managing to start at only one round with Danny Buchan. Dixon was offered an alternative ride half way through the year, with Lee Hardy's Briggs Equipment BMW S1000RR, but after six rounds his brakes failed at Oulton Park, resulting in a broken hip, ending his season prematurely.

He won both round-four races of the 2017 British Superbike Championship at Knockhill Racing Circuit. He finished 6th in the 2017 British Superbike Championship and was the youngest ever rider to make the final showdown, made up from the top six riders.

Dixon announced that he would stay with the Lee Hardy Racing/RAF Regular & Reserves Team in 2018, on a Kawasaki ZX10R 1000 cc machine in the 2018 British Superbike Championship. He finished his participation in the British Superbike Championship series in second position to champion Leon Haslam.

Superbike World Championship
Dixon also made his first appearance in the Superbike World Championship in 2017 as a wildcard entry at Donington Park, where he retired in the first race, and finished 9th place in the second race.

Moto2 World Championship

Dynavolt Intact GP (2017)
Dixon made his Moto2 debut at the 2017 British motorcycle Grand Prix at Silverstone riding for the Dynavolt/Intact Team replacing the injured Marcel Schrotter finishing 25th.

Ángel Nieto Team (2019)
For 2019 he signed to ride for the Spanish Aspar Team, in the 2019 Moto2 World Championship with team-mate Xavi Cardelús, aboard machinery using 765 cc Triumph controlled engines new to the series, and KTM chassis. He made his full debut as a Moto2 World Championship rider on board a KTM bike, but Jake Dixon’s full-time Moto2 bow, in Qatar of 2019, is not his first Moto2 Grand Prix appearance, having already appeared as a wildcard at Silverstone in 2017, a race he finished in 25th place. Dixon finished his debut season with 7 points.

Petronas Sepang Racing (2020–2021)
Jake Dixon joined Petronas Sprinta Racing for the 2020 Moto2 World Championship, alongside Xavi Vierge, in the team's third season in Grand Prix racing’s middleweight class. Dixon finished the 2020 season with 44 points.

In October 2020, Petronas Sprint Racing (Sepang Racing Team) announced that Jake Dixon would remain with the Malaysian team in Moto2 for the 2021 season. Dixon finished the year with 30 points.

GasGas Aspar Team (2022)
For 2022, Dixon is contracted to race for the Aspar Team branded as GasGas using a Kalex chassis in Moto2.

MotoGP World Championship

Petronas Yamaha SRT (2021)
Dixon also competed in two MotoGP races for Petronas Yamaha, finishing in 19th place at the British Grand Prix in August and falling on the second lap at Aragon in September 2021.

Personal life
In December 2018, Dixon married Sarah, daughter of former racer Eddie Roberts.

Career statistics

Grand Prix motorcycle racing

By season

By class

Races by year
(key) (Races in bold indicate pole position; races in italics indicate fastest lap)

|}
 Half points awarded as less than two thirds of the race distance (but at least three full laps) was completed.

References

External links

 Interview at Bennetts

1996 births
Living people
British motorcycle racers
English motorcycle racers
British Superbike Championship riders
Superbike World Championship riders
Moto2 World Championship riders
MotoGP World Championship riders
Sepang Racing Team MotoGP riders